Jumellea comorensis is a species of flowering plant in the family Orchidaceae.

References

comorensis
Orchids of Africa
Flora of the Comoros